Fort Union may refer to:
 Fort Union Formation, an economically important geologic formation in the northwestern United States
 Fort Union National Monument, site of a U. S. Army fort in New Mexico from 1851 to 1891
 Fort Union Trading Post National Historic Site, a trading post of the American Fur Company, operating between 1828 and 1867
 Fort Union, a major commercial area in Salt Lake County, Utah
 Fort Union (Wisconsin)

See also
 Fork Union, Virginia